Morrow Township is one of thirty-seven townships in Washington County, Arkansas, USA.

Geography

Cities, towns, villages
Morrow

Cemeteries
The township contains Bethesda Cemetery, Bethlehem Cemetery, Drake Cemetery, Edmiston Cemetery, and English Cemetery.

Major routes
  Arkansas Highway 45

See also
 Twin Bridges Historic District

References

 United States Census Bureau 2008 TIGER/Line Shapefiles
 United States National Atlas

External links
 US-Counties.com
 City-Data.com

Townships in Washington County, Arkansas
Populated places established in 1850
Townships in Arkansas